Morteza Moballegh is an Iranian reformist politician. He served as the political deputy to the Minister of Interior, being appointed on 8 May 2001. In the capacity, he also served as the head of Country's Election Headquarters until 2005.

In October 2001, he was charged for "spreading lies and slander" by Iranian Judiciary. In 2003, Moballegh questioned legal validity of the Guardian Council's appointments for liaison officer, cultural director, and election overseer. In January 2004, he threatened to resign following disqualifications of parliamentary candidates, including 83 incumbents by the Guardian Council and said he "will not hold such elections and will propose the Guardian Council hold the election itself".

References 

	

Living people
Islamic Iran Participation Front politicians
Union of Islamic Iran People Party politicians
Politicians from Isfahan
Iranian Vice Ministers
Year of birth missing (living people)